Shorea singkawang (called, along with some other species in the genus Shorea, dark red meranti or meranti merah) is a species of plant in the family Dipterocarpaceae. It is native to Sumatra, Peninsular Malaysia, and Thailand. It is threatened by habitat loss.

References

singkawang
Trees of Sumatra
Trees of Peninsular Malaysia
Trees of Thailand
Taxonomy articles created by Polbot